The discography of Ivy Queen, a Puerto Rican singer, consists of 10 studio albums, four compilation albums, seven EPs, one live album, 93 singles, and 62 music videos.

Albums

Studio

1990s

2000s

2010s

2020s

Following the installation of the Billboard Latin Rhythm Albums chart in 2005, reggaetón titles no longer appeared on certain charts including the Tropical Albums and Reggae Albums charts, making albums released by Queen after May 2005 ineligible for those charts.

Reissues

Compilations

Extended plays (EPs)

Live

Chart accomplishments

Singles

As lead performer

1990s

2000s

2010s

2020s

Promotional singles and other charted songs

As featured performer

On January 12, 2017, Billboard updated its methodology for the Tropical Songs chart to exclude any songs that do not fit in the tropical music category.

Chart accomplishments

Album appearances

1990s

2000s

2010s

2020s 

The same songs have appeared on multiple different albums therefore, only the earliest album appearance is listed above. Furthermore, songs included on albums by Queen are not listed.

Unreleased songs

Music videos

As lead performer

As featured performer

Cameo appearances

Live performances

Award show performances

Livestream concerts

Music festivals

2000s

2010s

2020s

Other credits

See also
List of awards and nominations received by Ivy Queen

Notes

References

Discographies of Puerto Rican artists
Reggaeton discographies
Discography